The following multigraphs are used in the Cyrillic script. The palatalized consonants of Russian and other languages written as C- are mostly predictable and therefore not included here unless they are irregular. Likewise, in the languages of the Caucasus, there are numerous other predictable multigraphs that are not included. Tatar also has discontinuous digraphs. See Cyrillic digraphs for examples.

А

:
 Archi: 

:
 Archi: 

:
 Dungan: 

:
 Chechen: 
 Ingush: 
 Tabasaran: 

:
 Archi:

Г
:
 Abaza: 
 Archi: 
 Lezgian: 

:
 Tabasaran: 

:
 Adyghe: 
 Kabardian: 
 Ossetian: 
 Also found in several other languages where  is used for labialization (though this is a predictable effect of assimilation, and therefore does not result in a true digraph).

:
 Aleut language (Bering dialect): 

:
 Abaza: 
 Adyghe: 
 Aghul: 
 Archi: 
 Avar: 
 Crimean Tatar: 
 Dargwa: 
 Kabardian: 
 Karachay-Balkar: 
 Kumyk: 
 Lezgian: 
 Ossetian: 
 Tabasaran: 
 Tatar: word-final 

:
 Abaza: 
 Archi: 
 Lezgian: 

:
 Adyghe: 
 Kabardian: 
 Ossetian: 

:
 Abaza: 

:
 Archi: 

:
 Archi: 

:
 Abaza: 
 Abkhaz: 
 Aghul: 
 Archi: 
 Avar: 
 Dargwa: 
 Kumyk: 
 Lezgian: 
 Tabasaran: 

:
 Abkhaz: 

:
 Abaza: 
 Aghul: 
 Archi: 
 Avar: 
 Chechen: 
 Dargwa: 
 Ingush: 

:
 Abaza:

Ӷ
:
 Abkhaz: 

:
 Abkhaz:

Д

 Abaza: 
 Adyghe: 
 Aghul: 
 Belarusian: 
 Bulgarian: 
 Crimean Tatar: 
 Dargwa: 
 Kabardian: 
 Karachay-Balkar:  (Karachay);  (Balkar)
 Komi: 
 Lezgian: 
 Ossetian: 
 Russian: 
 Tabasaran: 
 Ukrainian: 

 Abaza: 

 Abaza: 

 Abaza: 
 Adyghe: 
 Belarusian: 
 Bulgarian: 
 Dargwa: 
 Kabardian: 
 Komi: 
 Lezgian: 
 Ossetian: 
 Russian: 
 Tabasaran: 
 Ukrainian: 

:
 Adyghe: 

:
 Russian:  (though this is a predictable effect of assimilation, and therefore not a true digraph)

:
 Yakut: 

:
 Abkhaz:

Е

 Archi: 

 Archi: 

 Archi:

Ё
:
 Dungan: 

:
 Chechen:

Ж

 Abaza: 
 Archi: 
 Tabasaran: 

:
 Russian: usually not a digraph, and pronounced  (palatalized to  before  and palatalizing vowels).

:
 Russian: usually not a digraph, and pronounced . However, the conservative Moscow pronunciation uses the sound  (though this is becoming increasingly outdated).

:
 Russian:  (though this is a predictable effect of assimilation, and therefore not a true digraph)

:
 Adyghe: 

:
 Adyghe: 

:
 Abaza: 
 Abkhaz: 
 Adyghe: 
 Kabardian: 

:
 Abkhaz:

З
 :
 Archi: 
 Lezgian: 

:
 Russian:  (though this is a predictable effect of assimilation, and therefore not a true digraph)

Ӡ
:
 Abkhaz:

И
 :
 Archi: 

 :
 Archi: 

:
 Chechen: 
 Mongolian: 

 :
 Archi:

Й
:
 Moksha:

К

:
 Abaza: 
 Archi: 
 Lezgian:  or 

:
 Aghul: 
 Archi: 
 Avar: 
 Chechen: 
 Tabasaran: 

:
 Archi: 

:
 Chechen: 

:
 Archi: 

:
 Archi: 

:
 Archi: 

:
 Adyghe: 
 Kabardian: 
 Ossetian:  or 
 Also found in several other languages where  is used for labialization (though this is a predictable effect of assimilation, and therefore does not result in a true digraph).

:
 Chechen 
 Ingush 

 Kabardian: 

 Kabardian: 

:
 Abaza: 
 Adyghe: 
 Aghul: 
 Archi: 
 Avar: 
 Chechen: 
 Crimean Tatar: 
 Dargwa: 
 Ingush: 
 Kabardian: 
 Karachay-Balkar: 
 Kumyk:  or 
 Lezgian: 
 Ossetian: 
 Tabasaran: 
 Tatar: 

:
 Abaza: 
 Archi: 
 Lezgian: 

:
 Adyghe: 
 Kabardian: 
 Ossetian: 

:
 Abaza: 

:
 Archi: 

:
 Archi: 

:
 Abaza: 
 Abkhaz: 
 Aghul: 
 Archi:  or 
 Avar: 
 Dargwa: 
 Lezgian: 
 Tabasaran: 

:
 Archi: 
 Lezgian: 

:
 Abkhaz: 

:
 Abaza: 
 Adyghe:  or 
 Aghul: 
 Archi: 
 Avar: 
 Chechen: 
 Dargwa: 
 Ingush  or 
 Kabardian:  or 
 Lezgian: 
 Tabasaran: 

:
 Abaza: 
 Archi: 
 Lezgian: 

:
 Avar: 

:
 Adyghe: 
 Kabardian: 

:
 Abaza: 

:
 Itelmen: 
 Nivkh:

Қ
:
 Abkhaz: 

:
 Abkhaz:

Ҟ
:
 Abkhaz: 

:
 Abkhaz:

Ӄ
:
 Itelmen: 
 Nivkh:

Л
:
 Archi: 

:
 Archi: 

:
 Moksha: 
 Mongolian: 

:
 Adyghe: 
 Archi: 
 Avar: 
 Kabardian: 

:
 Archi: 

:
 Avar: 

:
 Abaza: 

 :
 Abaza: 
 Adyghe: 
 Archi: 
 Avar: 
 Kabardian: 

 :
 Archi:

Н
:
 Karachay-Balkar: 
 Kumyk:  or 
 Uzbek: 

:
 Crimean Tatar: 

:
 Yakut: 
 In the cyrillization of Chinese it is used for a word-final , equivalent to pinyin .

О
:
 Chechen: 
 Ingush: 

:
 Selkup: 

:
 Dungan 

 :
 Archi: 

 :
 Archi: 

:
 Chechen: 
 Kumyk: 
 Nogai: 

 :
 Archi:

П

 Aghul: 
 Archi: 
 Chechen 
 Tabasaran: 

:
 Ossetian: 

 :
 Abaza: 
 Adyghe: 
 Aghul: 
 Archi: 
 Chechen: 
 Dargwa: 
 Ingush 
 Kabardian: 
 Lezgian: 
 Tabasaran: 

 :
 Adyghe: 

:
 Itelmen: 
 Nivkh:

Р
:
 Moksha: 

:
 Chechen: 
 Ingush

С
:
 Archi: 
 Lezgian: 

:
 Russian:  (though this is a predictable effect of assimilation, and therefore not a true digraph)

:
 Aghul: 
 Archi: 
 Avar: 
 Chechen: 

:
 Russian:  (though this is a predictable effect of assimilation, and therefore not a true digraph)

Т
 :
 Archi: 
 Lezgian:  or 

 :
 Abaza: 

:
 Aghul: 
 Archi: 
 Chechen: 
 Tabasaran: 

:
 Russian:  (though this is a predictable effect of assimilation, and therefore not a true digraph)

:
 Abaza: 
 Komi: 

:
 Ossetian: 

:
 Abkhaz: 

:
 Abaza: 
 Adyghe: 
 Aghul: 
 Archi: 
 Avar: 
 Chechen: 
 Dargwa: 
 Ingush 
 Kabardian: 
 Lezgian: 
 Tabasaran: 

 :
 Lezgian: 

:
 Adyghe: 

:
 Itelmen: 
 Nivkh:

Ҭ
:
 Abkhaz:

У
:
 Chechen: 
 Ingush: 

 :
 Archi: 

 :
 Archi: 

:
 Aghul: 
 Chechen: 
 Kumyk: 
 Lezgian: 
 Nogai: 
 Tabasaran: 

:
 Chechen: 

 :
 Archi:

Ү
:
 Turkmen: (until 1993, in that year the Turkmen alphabet became Latin)

Ф
:
 Aghul: 

:
 Abaza: 
 Kabardian:

Х
:
 Abaza: 
 Archi: 
 Lezgian: 

:
 Kabardian: 
 Ossetian: 

:
 Aghul: 
 Archi: 
 Avar: 

:
 Archi: 

:
 Archi: 

:
 Archi: 

:
 Abaza: 
 Adyghe: 
 Aghul: 
 Archi: 
 Avar: 
 Dargwa: 
 Kabardian: 
 Lezgian: 
 Ossetian: 
 Tabasaran: 

:
 Abaza: 
 Archi: 
 Lezgian: 

:
 Adyghe: 
 Kabardian: 
 Ossetian: 

:
 Archi: 

:
 Archi: 

:
 Abaza: 
 Abkhaz: 
 Adyghe: 
 Aghul: 
 Avar: 
 Chechen: 
 Dargwa: 
 Ingush: 
 Kabardian: 
 Lezgian: 
 Tabasaran: 

:
 Lezgian: 

:
 Aghul: 
 Avar: 

:
 Archi: 

:
 Archi: 

:
 Abkhaz: 

:
 Abaza: 
 Aghul: 
 Archi: 
 Avar: 
 Chechen: 
 Dargwa: 
 Ingush 

:
 Abaza:

Ҳ
:
 Abkhaz:

Ц
 :
 Archi: 
 Lezgian:  or 

:

:
 Adyghe: 

:
 Aghul: 
 Avar: 
 Tabasaran: 

:
 Archi: 

:
 Ossetian: 

:
 Abkhaz: 

:
 Abaza: 
 Aghul: 
 Archi: 
 Avar: 
 Chechen: 
 Dargwa: 
 Ingush 
 Kabardian: 
 Lezgian: 
 Tabasaran: 

 :
 Lezgian: 

:
 Avar:

Ҵ
:
 Abkhaz:

Ч
:
 Abaza: 
 Archi: 
 Tabasaran: 

:

:
 Aghul: 
 Avar: 
 Tabasaran: 

:
 Adyghe: 
 Ossetian: 

:
 Abaza: 
 Adyghe: 
 Aghul: 
 Archi: 
 Avar: 
 Chechen: 
 Dargwa: 
 Ingush 
 Lezgian: 
 Tabasaran: 

:
 Abaza: 
 Archi: 

:
 Avar: 

:
 Itelmen:

Џ
:
 Abkhaz:

Ш
:
 Abaza: 
 Archi: 
 Tabasaran: 

:
 Russian:  (though this is a predictable effect of assimilation, and therefore not a true digraph)

:
 Adyghe: 

:
 Adyghe: 

:
 Abkhaz: 

:
 Abkhaz: 

:
 Abaza: 
 Adyghe: 

:
 Adyghe:

Щ
:
 Archi: 

:
 Kabardian:

Э
:
 Dungan: 

:
 Archi: 

:
 Archi: 

:
 Archi:

Ю
:

:
 Chechen:

Я
:
 Dungan: 

:
 Chechen: 
 Ingush

:
 Adyghe: 
 Kabardian:

See also
List of Cyrillic letters
Tetragraph
Pentagraph

References

Cyrillic digraphs
Trigraphs (orthography)